The 2021 Caribbean Club Championship (officially the 2021 Flow CONCACAF Caribbean Club Championship for sponsorship reasons) was the 23rd edition of the Caribbean Club Championship (also known as the CFU Club Championship), the first-tier annual international club football competition in the Caribbean region, held amongst clubs whose football associations are affiliated with the Caribbean Football Union (CFU), a sub-confederation of CONCACAF.

The tournament was played in the Dominican Republic between 15 and 25 May 2021. As a result of the cancellation of the 2021 CONCACAF Caribbean Club Shield due to the COVID-19 pandemic, the 2021 CONCACAF Caribbean Club Championship was expanded to include a number of teams originally set to participate in the 2021 CONCACAF Caribbean Club Shield.

The winners of the 2021 CONCACAF Caribbean Club Championship qualified to the 2022 CONCACAF Champions League, and the second, third and fourth place teams qualified to the 2021 CONCACAF League, as long as they comply with the minimum CONCACAF Club Licensing requirements for the CONCACAF Champions League or CONCACAF League.

Portmore United, having won the title in 2019, are the title holders. The 2020 edition was cancelled due to the COVID-19 pandemic and the title was not awarded.

Teams

A total of 13 teams from 11 associations entered the expanded 2021 CONCACAF Caribbean Club Championship.
Among the 31 CFU member associations, four of them were classified as professional leagues and each may enter two teams in the CONCACAF Caribbean Club Championship. Before the expansion of the tournament, six teams from three associations originally entered. However, the two teams from Jamaica later withdrew, and only four teams from two associations (Dominican Republic and Haiti) entered the expanded tournament.
Originally, a total of 14 teams from 14 associations which were classified as non-professional leagues entered the 2021 CONCACAF Caribbean Club Shield. After its cancellation, 9 of the 14 teams instead participated in the expanded 2021 CONCACAF Caribbean Club Championship. Initially, 11 teams would participate, but Racing Club Aruba (Aruba), South East (Dominica) and Platinum FC (Saint Lucia) withdrew, while Hope International (Saint Vincent and the Grenadines) were added.

Association with professional league whose teams did not enter

Notes

Venues
The matches were played at the Estadio Olímpico Félix Sánchez in Santo Domingo and Estadio Panamericano in San Cristóbal.

Original format
Before the expansion of the tournament, the 2021 CONCACAF Caribbean Club Championship would originally be played at the Félix Sánchez Olympic Stadium in Santo Domingo, Dominican Republic, between 14 and 26 May 2021, and six teams from three associations entered. The original draw for the group stage was held on 25 February 2021, 11:00 EST (UTC−5), at the CONCACAF Headquarters in Miami, United States. The six teams were drawn into two groups of three. The two teams from hosts Dominican Republic were placed in Pot 1, the two teams from Haiti were placed in Pot 2, while the two teams from Jamaica were placed in Pot 3. This ensured that teams from the same association could not be drawn into the same group.

The original draw results and schedule were as follows:
Group stage
Group A:  Universidad O&M,  Cavaly,  Portmore United
14 May 2021, 18:30: Universidad O&M v Cavaly
16 May 2021, 18:30: Cavaly v Portmore United
18 May 2021, 18:30: Universidad O&M v Portmore United
Group B:  Delfines del Este,  Don Bosco,  Waterhouse
14 May 2021, 21:00: Delfines del Este v Don Bosco
16 May 2021, 21:00: Don Bosco v Waterhouse
18 May 2021, 21:00: Delfines del Este v Waterhouse
Knockout stage
Semi-finals
21 May 2021, 18:30: Group A Winners v Group B Runners-up
21 May 2021, 21:00: Group B Winners v Group A Runners-up
Third place match
23 May 2021, 17:00: Semi-final 1 Losers v Semi-final 2 Losers
Final
23 May 2021, 20:00: Semi-final 1 Winners v Semi-final 2 Winners
CONCACAF League playoff
26 May 2021, 20:00: Club Championship 4th place v Club Shield Winners

Group stage
After the expansion of the tournament, the new draw for the group stage was held on 23 April 2021, 11:00 EDT (UTC−4), at the CONCACAF Headquarters in Miami, United States. The 15 teams were drawn into four groups: three groups of four teams (Groups A–C) and one group of three teams (Group D). The four teams from the Dominican Republic and Haiti were placed in Pot 1 and drawn to position 1 of the four groups. The 11 teams originally set to participate in the 2021 CONCACAF Caribbean Club Shield were placed in Pot 2 and drawn to positions 2, 3 and 4 of the four groups. This ensured that teams from the same association could not be drawn into the same group.

After the draw was made, Hope International (Saint Vincent and the Grenadines) were added to Group D, and each group would have four teams. Later, Racing Club Aruba (Aruba) and Platinum FC (Saint Lucia) withdrew, and there were only two teams left in Group B. To ensure that each group had a minimum of three teams, a draw was held on 13 May 2021 to relocate a team from Group A to Group B, and Metropolitan (Puerto Rico) were moved. South East (Dominica) also withdrew, so eventually there were three teams in Groups A–C, and four teams in Group D.

The winners of each group advanced to the semi-finals.

Tiebreakers
The ranking of teams in each group is determined as follows (Regulations Article 12.1):
Points obtained in all group matches (three points for a win, one for a draw, zero for a loss);
Goal difference in all group matches;
Number of goals scored in all group matches;
Points obtained in the matches played between the teams in question;
Goal difference in the matches played between the teams in question;
Number of goals scored in the matches played between the teams in question;
Fair play points in all group matches (only one deduction could be applied to a player in a single match): 
Drawing of lots.

All times local, AST (UTC−4).

Group A

Group B

Group C

Group D

Knockout stage

Bracket
The semi-final matchups would be:
SF1: Group A Winners vs. Group B Winners
SF2: Group C Winners vs. Group D Winners
The winners of SF1 and SF2 would play in the final.

Semi-finals

Final

Top goalscorers

Awards
The following awards were given at the conclusion of the tournament:

Qualification to CONCACAF Champions League and CONCACAF League

The top four teams of the 2021 CONCACAF Caribbean Club Championship qualify for the 2022 CONCACAF Champions League or 2021 CONCACAF League as long as they comply with the minimum CONCACAF Club Licensing requirements for the CONCACAF Champions League or CONCACAF League.
Champions qualify for 2022 CONCACAF Champions League.
Runners-up qualify for 2021 CONCACAF League round of 16.
Losing semi-finalists qualify for 2021 CONCACAF League preliminary round. The team with the better record are ranked 3rd overall, and the team with the worse record are ranked 4th overall, for seeding in the CONCACAF League preliminary round draw.

Notes

See also
2021 Caribbean Club Shield
2021 CONCACAF League
2022 CONCACAF Champions League

References

External links
Caribbean Club Championship, CONCACAF.com

2021
1
2021 CONCACAF League
2022 CONCACAF Champions League
International association football competitions hosted by the Dominican Republic
May 2021 sports events in North America